The Royal Academy of Engineering of Spain (Spanish: Real Academia de Ingeniería, RAI) is a corporation under public law entity that is governed by its statutes and by its internal regulations. Its main function is to promote works and studies that reflect scientific progress in the field of engineering, its technological applications and its operational techniques.

Its current President is :es:Elías Fereres Castiel.

History 
The Academy of Engineering was created by virtue of Royal Decree 859/1994, of 29 April, making it the first national academy to be founded under the reign of King Juan Carlos I.

The Academy of Engineering is a corporation under public law and a distinct legal entity that is governed by its statutes and by its internal regulations. Its main function is to promote works and studies that reflect scientific progress in the field of engineering, its technological applications and its operational techniques.

Its first thirty-six members were appointed by virtue of Ministerial Order of 1 December 1994. These members were designated by the Ministry of Education, having been put forward by the Spanish Institute of Engineering (18 members), the Universities (7 members), the Institute of Spain (6 members) and the Secretary of State for Universities and Research (5 members).

From its foundation and until early 1999, the academy remained under the protectorate of the Ministry of Education, its president being the Secretary of State for Universities and Research, who delegated the presidency to the academy member Elías Fereres. A provisional governing board was formed by the president-delegate and the members Emilio Llorente, José Antonio Garrido, Antonio Luque, José Ramón Irisarri, César Dopazo, Manuel Elices and Andrés Ripoll.

Over the course of these early years of operation, among other activities, the constituent members drew up a set of internal regulations that covered several aspects, including the election of new members. This procedure has continued to be applied through national calls for new members in order to fill the sixty permanent member seats established by the statutes.

The Ministry of Education protectorate period ended on 19 January 1999 and the Academy of Engineering entered a new phase with the election of its first autonomous governing board, formed by the members Elías Fereres, :es:Antonio Luque López, Enrique Alarcón, Javier Aracil, César Dopazo and Mateo Valero Cortés.

Since its beginnings, the Academy of Engineering has received international recognition. It has been admitted as a member of the Council of Academies of Engineering and Technological Sciences (CAETS) and was one of the founding members of the European Council of Applied Sciences and Engineering (Euro-CASE). It has carried out and continues to carry out important collaborative work with both organisations.

On 30 January 2003, for the 2003–2007 period, the second governing board was elected, formed by the members Enrique Alarcón, Andrés Ripoll, Aníbal R. Figueiras, Jaime Torroja, Pere Brunet, and Roberto Fernández de Caleya. Following the passing away of Roberto Fernández de Caleya, on 29 April 2004 Mrs. María Vallet was elected to replace him.

On 14 July 2003 H.M. King Juan Carlos I granted the Academy of Engineering Royal status. Another equally important historical milestone took place on 11 December of the same year when H.M. the King presided over the public session in which Leopoldo Calvo-Sotelo took possession of his seat as Honorary Member.

On the initiative of the Royal Academy of Engineering, on 9 May 2005 the Pro Rebus Academiae Foundation was founded. The purpose of the foundation is to support the activities of the Royal Academy of Engineering and contribute to its maintenance by relying on the assistance of companies and institutions with an interest in the development and improvement of engineering.

On 7 June 2005, the State Heritage Department, through the Ministry of Education and Science, granted the use of the public area of the palace of the Marquis of Villafranca (a Spanish Historical Heritage building) to the Royal Academy of Engineering as its headquarters for the provision of its services and the carrying out of its activities.

H.M. the King officially opened the headquarters of the Royal Academy of Engineering on 16 November 2010 following the completion of the building refurbishment works, which had taken twenty months.

On 27 January 2007, for the 2007–2011 period, the third governing board was elected, formed by the members Aníbal R. Figueiras, Pere Brunet, José Antonio Martín Pereda, Ramón Argüelles, Enrique Cerdá and José Ignacio Pérez Arriaga.

The current governing board was elected on 5 April 2011 and is formed by the members Elías Fereres, Javier Aracil, Joaquim Coello, Mrs. Josefina Gómez Mendoza, Luis Gil, Manuel Hita, Ricardo Torrón, Ramón Agustí, Manuel Márquez and Elías Muñoz.

Headquarters 

The Royal Academy of Engineering has its headquarters in the mansion of the Marquis of Villafranca, in the historical centre of Madrid, very near to Bailén street, Las Vistillas and the Royal Palace. Building work began back in the 17th century, being completed in the 18th century by the 5th Marquis of Villafranca, Pedro Alvarez de Toledo, the namesake of the street where the building is located.

By means of the Ministerial Order of 31 May 2005 by the Ministry of Education and Science, the use of the public part of the palace was ceded to the Royal Academy of Engineering in exchange for the commitment by the latter to restore the building.

The Royal Academy of Engineering covered the cost of the restoration project after raising the necessary funds to do so, with contributions by the Ministry of Public Works through its 1% culture budget and, to a large extent, by some of the companies in the Pro Rebus Academiae Foundation, more specifically Grupo Villar Mir, Telefónica, and Repsol. The restoration work not only dealt with restoring the rooms in the Academy, but also reinstating all the artistic elements in their original places, meaning that today, in the 21st century, the history of these rooms can still be felt.

When the restoration work on the building was completed on November 16, 2010, the King of Spain officially opened the headquarters of the Royal Academy of Engineering. The work on the building began in 2007 with the authorisation of the property restoration project by the Ministry of Education and Science.

The history of the property shows the progressive development of the site from the medieval city wall, moving on to the choice of the site by the Infantado and Villafranca families and the subsequent evolution of the urban development through to the 19th century. The Palace, built between 1717 and 1734 under the supervision of the architect Francisco Ruiz, coincided with the gradual establishment in Madrid of the Alvarez de Toledo family, which reached its maximum splendour through the union with the Medina Sidionia and Alba families as a result of the wedding between the 11th Marquis José Álvarez de Toledo y Dubois and María Cayetana de Silva, 13th Duchess of Alba. After this period, the 19th century was witness to the rise of a new noble class based on agricultural and industrial success, and particularly that of Pérez-Seoana y Roca de Togores family, the Barons of Riudoms, appointed Duke of Pinohermoso in 1790 and Grandee of Spain in 1794 by Charles IV of Spain. This family acquired the palace in 1872 and was responsible for organizing the décor lasting through to our day, in which an important role was played by the architect :es:Arturo Mélida, and which the current restoration process has returned to its original splendor.

The 20th century saw the gradual disintegration of the property. In 1965, the noble part was sold to the restaurant Puerta de Moros which occupied it until 1989. The same year, the Agencia del Aceite de Oliva (Olive Oil Agency) converted it into their administration services centre until May 12, 2005, when the Royal Academy of Engineering was ceded the use of the building.

All this was described in the work La Sede de la Real Academia de Ingeniería. Historia del Palacio de los Marqueses de Villafranca (The Headquarters of the Royal Academy of Engineering. The History of the Palace of the Marquises of Villafranca) a complete study of the origins and vicissitudes of the Palace, with the academy member Enrique Alarcón taking charge of management of the building in 2008. It was carried out by a group of pupils of the member Josefina Gomez Mendoza: Ángela García Carballo, Gonzalo Madrazo García de Lomana and Juan Francisco Mato Miguel.

Awards 
The Royal Academy of Engineering, with the support of Pro Rebus Academia Foundation, announces once a year the Agustín de Betancour and Juan López de Peñalver Awards, intended for young researchers, who has contributed relevantly to any of the fields of Engineering or Architecture, to useful science applications, or to any historical or social aspects related to them.

The Agustín de Betancourt and Juan López de Peñalver Awards have been bestowed on young engineers (under 36 years old) who in accordance with the terms and conditions of the call for applications have carried out their studies in the fields of engineering or architecture, in practical applications of the sciences or historical/social aspects related to all of the above.

Along with it, the Royal Academy of Engineering holds the Academiae Dilecta Award, aimed at companies that have either marketed for the first time in the world a product that has been produced through scientific and technological research and development, or have consistently based their business strategy on the use of new technologies, to which R&D activity carried out internally or in other Spanish centres must have contributed.

The Academiae Dilecta Award, aimed at companies that have either marketed for the first time in the world a product that has been produced through scientific and technological research and development, or have consistently based their business strategy on the use of new technologies, to which R&D activity carried out internally or in other Spanish centres must have contributed.

External relationships 
Among other functions, the External Relations Committee is responsible for relations with engineering academies from other countries and institutions of an international nature. These relations facilitate the identification and implementation of joint initiatives that have a positive impact thanks to the exchange of ideas and the spirit of collaboration that are achieved.

The Royal Academy of Engineering reinforces its international presence through its corresponding members, who, as professionals from a variety of engineering disciplines, have shown exceptional merit over the course of their careers and who reside outside Spain. The academy currently has 40 corresponding members from 14 countries.

The Royal Academy of Engineering is a member of the European Council of Applied Sciences and Engineering(Euro-CASE).

Furthermore, and with an international scope, the Royal Academy of Engineering is a member of the International Council of Academies of Engineering and Technological Sciences (CAETS)  engineering and technology academies in the world.

Common cultural roots facilitate very close collaboration with Latin American engineering academies, with which the Royal Academy of Engineering exchanges ideas and experiences related to various areas of engineering and their implementation in society.

Members

Governing Board 
The Governing Board was elected in the plenary session held on 12 April 2011 and is formed by the following members:
President, Elías Fereres Castiel
Vice President, Javier Aracil Santonja
Vice President, Joaquim Coello Brufau
Vice President, Josefina Gómez Mendoza
General Secretary, Luis Alfonso Gil Sánchez
Treasurer, Manuel Hita Romero
Librarian, Ramón Agustí Comes
Supervisor, Ricardo Torrón Duran
Member, Manuel Márquez Balín
Member, Elías Muñoz Merino

Constituent Members 

Eugenio Andrés Puente
Javier Aracil Santonja
Ramón Argüelles Álvarez
José Luis Díaz Fernández
Gabriel Ferraté Pascual
José Antonio Garrido Martínez
José Ramón Irisarri Yela
Antonio Luque López
Emilio Llorente Gómez
Manuel Márquez Balín
José Antonio Martín Pereda
Elías Muñoz Merino
Luis Alberto Petit Herrera
Rafael Portaencasa Baeza
Andrés Ripoll Muntaner
Enrique Sánchez-Monge y Parellada (Deceased 01-07-10)
Jaime Torroja Menéndez
Mateo Valero
Enrique Alarcón Álvarez
Eduardo Alonso Pérez de Ágreda
Antonio Barrero Ripoll (Deceased 04-26-10)
Pere Brunet Crosa
Luis Castañer Muñoz
Elías Fereres Castiel
Francisco García Olmedo
Manuel Elices Calafat
José Antonio Fernández Ordóñez (Deceased 03-01-00)
Amable Liñán
Adriano García-Loygorri y Ruiz
Manuel Valdivia Ureña
Enrique Castillo Ron
Avelino Corma Canos
César Dopazo García
Rafael Moneo
Ignasi de Solà-Morales (Deceased 03-12-01)
Ángel Ramos Fernández (Deceased 01-02-98)

Elected permanent members 

Javier Rui-Wamba Martija
Juan Ramón Sanmartín Losada
Juan-Miguel Villar Mir
Juan José Martínez García (Deceased 08-06-01)
Miguel Ángel Lagunas Hernández
Aníbal R Figueiras Vidal
Miguel Ángel Losada Rodríguez
Enrique Cerdá Olmedo
Manuel Silva Suárez
Roberto Fernández de Caleya y Álvarez (Deceased 23-01-04)
Jaime Domínguez Abascal
Ricardo Torrón Durán
José Alberto Pardos Carrión
Pilar Carbonero Zalduegui
Joan Margarit i Consarnau
José Ignacio Pérez Arriaga
María Vallet Regí
José Luis López Ruiz (Deceased 04-20-09)
Andrés López Pita
Antonio Colino Martínez
Joaquim Coello Brufau
Javier Jiménez Sendín
Josefina Gómez Mendoza
Luis Lada Diaz
Manuel Doblaré Castellano
Luis Alfonso Gil Sánchez
Jaime Conde Zurita
José Manuel Sanjurjo Jul
Manuel Hita Romero
Ramón Agustí Comes
Juan Antonio Zufiria Zatarain
José Domínguez Abascal
Eloy Ignacio Álvarez Pelegry

Académicos correspondientes 

Germany
Johann Böhme
Jörg Schlaich
Australia
Martin Andrew Green
Canada
Cristina Amon
 Yuhang Li
Spain
Dr Pedro Duque
United States of America
Dr Raymon J Krizek
Angel G. Jordan
Dr Jesús A del Álamo
Dr Juan Fernández de la Mora
Dr Manuel Martínez Sánchez
Dr Juan Carlos Lasheras
Dr Michael Ortiz
John L. Hennessy
Dr Steven N Anastasion
Norman Ernest Borlaug (Deceased 09-12-09)
Dr Jeffrey Hoffman
Dr James R Rice
William Wulf
Janos Galambos
Carlos Fernández-Pello
Judea Pearl
Dr Bora B Mikic
Thomas Kailath
Dr Jose M Roesset
Dr Mark E Davis
Zdeněk P. Bažant
Subra Suresh
France
Dr Germain Sanz
Dr Claude Wolff
Netherlands
Louise Fresco
Hungary
Dr Norber Kroo
Italy
Dr Federico Mazzolani
Mexico
Francisco José Sánchez Sesma
Baltasar Mena Iniesta
Portugal
Dr Emanuel Jose Leandro Maranha das Neves
United Kingdom
Robert Malpas
Maurice Wilkes
Dr Basil RR Butler
Dr Christopher Bishop
Russia
Dr Viacheslav M Andreev
Zhores Alferov
Switzerland
Bruno Thürlimann (Deceased 07-29-08)
Werner Arber
Uruguay
Dr Andrés Tierno Abreu

References

External links 
Official webpage of the Royal Academy of Engineering
Pro Rebus Academiae Foundation

E
National academies of engineering